Linda K. Neuman (born 1948) is an American attorney and jurist who served as a justice of the Iowa Supreme Court from August 4, 1986, to July 11, 2003. She was appointed from Scott County, Iowa.

Early life and education 
Neuman was born in Chicago in 1948. She moved to Denver with her family in 1956. Neuman received a Bachelor of Arts degree from the University of Colorado Boulder in 1970 and a Juris Doctor from the University of Colorado Law School in 1973.

Career 
After marrying her husband in 1977, Neuman moved to the Quad Cities region. She worked as a trust officer at a local bank and was a professor at the University of Iowa before her appointment as a judicial magistrate for Scott County, Iowa. She was appointed to the Iowa Supreme Court by Governor Terry Branstad in 1986, becoming the first woman to serve on the court.

Neuman was inducted into the Iowa Women's Hall of Fame in 2015.

See also
List of female state supreme court justices

References

Justices of the Iowa Supreme Court
Living people
Place of birth missing (living people)
20th-century American judges
21st-century American judges
20th-century American women judges
21st-century American women judges
1948 births
People from Chicago
People from Denver
University of Colorado Boulder alumni
University of Colorado Law School alumni
Iowa Women's Hall of Fame Inductees